Powder Blue is a 2009 American drama film with an ensemble cast featuring several interconnected story arcs. It was written and directed by Timothy Linh Bui, and features Patrick Swayze's last film role before his death in September that same year. The film saw only limited theatrical release in the United States and was ultimately released principally on DVD in May 2009. The film was subsequently released in Kazakhstan and Russia and on US cable television premium movie channels in late 2009.

Plot
Several Los Angeles residents meet on Christmas Eve through chance, tragedy, loss and divine intervention.

Velvet Larry is the head of a corporate crime organization. He owns a sleazy strip club where Rose-Johnny, a single mother whose young son is in a coma, dances. Qwerty Doolittle is a young mortician who falls in love with her. Velvet Larry tries to convince Jack Doheny, his former employee, not to seek vengeance on his co-workers. Doheny later reveals to Rose-Johnny that he is her father. Charlie is a suicidal ex-priest. Lexus is a pre-op trans woman prostitute who shares an unexpected emotional bond with the priest.

Cast
 Jessica Biel as Rose-Johnny
 Eddie Redmayne as Qwerty Doolittle
 Forest Whitaker as Charlie
 Ray Liotta as Jack Doheny
 Lisa Kudrow as Sally
 Patrick Swayze as Velvet Larry
 Kris Kristofferson as Randall
 Alejandro Romero as Lexus
 Sanaa Lathan as Diana
 Chandler Canterbury as Billy
 Jeffrey Adam Baker as "Slim"
 Ravi Patel as Sanjay
 Don Swayze as The Bouncer
 L. Scott Caldwell as Nurse Gomez
 Riki Lindhome as Nicole
 Billy Wirth as David

Reception
According to Variety magazine, "the heartstring-pulling contrivances of the film, set during Christmastime, go way over the top... Biel often overacts even more than her role requires". The magazine calls director Bui's "trumpeting of the power of love in the city of lonely hearts ... both ear-splittingly loud and tone-deaf at the same time" with  "Jonathan Sela's color palette of nightmarish reds and blues and blinding whites, simply enforc[ing] the pic's borderline hysteria".

Rotten Tomatoes gives the film a 25% rating from eight critic reviews with an average rating of 3.7 out of 10."

See also
 List of Christmas films

References

External links

2009 drama films
2009 films
American Christmas films
American drama films
Films set in Los Angeles
Transgender-related films
Hyperlink films
2009 LGBT-related films
Films about striptease
2000s English-language films
2000s American films
2000s Christmas films